Vsevolod Murakhovsky (20 October 1926 – 12 January 2017) was a Ukrainian-Soviet politician who served as first deputy premier during the leadership of Soviet general secretary Mikhail Gorbachev.

Early life and education
Murakhovsky hailed from a Ukrainian family. He was born in a village, Holubivka, near Kreminna (Luhansk Oblast), on 20 October 1926. He attended Stavropol Pedagogical Institute and graduated in 1954.

Career
Murakhovsky served in the Soviet army from 1944 to 1950. In 1946, he joined the Communist Party. Then he worked as a communist party officer in the Stavropol region from 1954 to 1985. He was first secretary of the Stavropol Party gorkom in the period 1970-1974 and first secretary of the Karachai-Cherkessia Party obkom between 1975 and 1978. He also served as the first secretary of the Stavropol Komsomol Committee. He replaced Mikhail Gorbachev as first secretary of party's regional committee when the latter was appointed to party's central committee secretariat in Moscow in 1978. In 1981, Murakhovsky became a full member of the party's central committee. 

Murakhovsky's term as first secretary of the Stavropol Komsomol Committee ended in November 1985 when he was appointed by Mikhail Gorbachev as one of the three first deputy premiers. It was his first post in Soviet administration. Murakhovsky was in charge of agriculture and related affairs and was also appointed chairman of the state committee for the agro-industrial complex, Gosagroprom, which was abolished in 1989. The reason for its disestablishment was its proven inefficiency for which Gorbachev criticised Murakhovsky. Murakhovsky's term also ended in 1989.

Death
Murakhovsky died on 12 January 2017, aged 90.

Decorations and awards
 Hero of Socialist Labour (1982)
 Two Orders of Lenin
 Order of the October Revolution
 Order of the Patriotic War, 2nd class
 Order of the Red Banner of Labour
 Order of the Badge of Honour
 Medal "For Services to the Stavropol Territory" (2001)
 Honorary Citizen of the Stavropol Territory (awarded by Resolution of the Governor of the Stavropol Territory on 28 October 2008 for his contribution to the economic, social and cultural development of the Stavropol Territory)

References

External links

1926 births
2017 deaths
Burials in Troyekurovskoye Cemetery
Central Committee of the Communist Party of the Soviet Union members
People's commissars and ministers of the Soviet Union
People from Luhansk Oblast
Heroes of Socialist Labour
Recipients of the Order of Lenin